Fairmont Hotel may refer to:

 Fairmont Hotels and Resorts, a Canada-based operator of luxury hotels and resorts
 Fairmont Nile City, a hotel in Cairo next to the Nile River, in Egypt
 Fairmont Palliser Hotel, a 1914 hotel in Calgary, Alberta, of the Fairmont Hotels and Resorts chain
 Hotel Vancouver,  branded currently as the Fairmont Hotel Vancouver
 Fairmont San Francisco, California
 Fairmont San Jose, California
 Fairmont Hotel (San Antonio, Texas)
 Fairmont Hotel (Spokane, Washington), listed on the National Register of Historic Places in Spokane County, Washington

See also
 The Roosevelt New Orleans, formerly the Fairmont New Orleans
 Fairmont Olympic Hotel (Seattle), a historic hotel in downtown Seattle, Washington
 Fairmount Hotel (disambiguation)